Faruk Hodžić (born 4 August 2003) is a Bosnian professional footballer who plays as a defensive midfielder for Bosnian Premier League club Sarajevo.

References

External links

2003 births
Living people
Footballers from Sarajevo
Bosnia and Herzegovina footballers
Bosnia and Herzegovina youth international footballers
Association football midfielders
Premier League of Bosnia and Herzegovina players
FK Sarajevo players